Abiamiri is a surname. Notable people with the surname include:

 Rob Abiamiri (born 1982), American football player
 Victor Abiamiri (born 1986), American football player, brother of Rob